Dewey Starkey (May 9, 1898 – September 3, 1974) was an American assistant director. He worked on 41 films between 1930 and 1944. He won an Academy Award in 1933 for Best Assistant Director. He was born in Ohio and died in Orange County, California.

References

External links

1898 births
1974 deaths
American film directors
Best Assistant Director Academy Award winners